Roberto López may refer to:
Roberto López (musician), Colombian-Canadian composer, musician and producer
 Roberto López (rower) (born 1993), Salvadoran rower
 Roberto López (tennis) (born 1968), Mexican tennis player
 Roberto López (footballer, born 2000) (Roberto López Alcaide), Spanish footballer
 Roberto López-Corrales (born 1974), aka ROLOCO, Spanish visual artist and composer
 Rúper (Roberto López Esquiroz, born 1987), Spanish footballer
 Roberto López González (born 1958), Mexican politician representing Jalisco for the PRD
 Roberto López Rosado (born 1961), Mexican politician representing Oaxaca for the PRD
 Roberto López Suárez (born 1972), Mexican politician representing Zacatecas for the PRD
 Roberto López Ufarte (born 1958), Spanish footballer
 Christian Roberto López (born 1987), Mexican footballer

See also
 Robert Lopez (disambiguation)
 Roberto Lopes (disambiguation)